Jay Huguley (born July 26, 1966) is an American film, TV and theatre actor, best known for playing David on AMC's The Walking Dead, and Jimmy Ledoux on HBO's True Detective.

Early life and education
Huguley was born in Englewood, New Jersey and raised in nearby Tenafly, New Jersey, the youngest of three boys, to father Arthur W. Huguley, III, a commodities trader and president of Westway Trading Corporation, and mother Katherine McCrae Yarborough Huguley, a housewife.

As a child, Huguley spent his teenage years attending the Peddie School, a boarding school in Hightstown, New Jersey, from where he later graduated. He spent a year abroad at the University of London studying political science and graduated from American University in Washington, D.C., with a double major in political science and communications.

Huguley studied acting at the Lee Strasberg Theatre and Film Institute, under the aegis of Anna Strasberg, and at the Beverly Hills Playhouse in Los Angeles, under the world-renowned teacher Milton Katselas.

Career

Prior to his professional acting career, Huguley was a fashion model. Following college, he was discovered working as a lifeguard, when someone working in fashion in New York suggested he should try modeling. Two Polaroids were taken of him, and he was brought into New York City. Soon after. he received a contract with Wilhelmina Models, which sent him to London, Paris, Milan and Sydney, Australia.

Huguley lived in Paris throughout the early-1990s, where he worked as a model for brands like Armani, Valentino, Zegna and Romeo Gigli. He first realized his passion for acting while taking a directing class in college, where one of his assignments was to audition for the school play to get an idea of what actors experience in their process of attempting to score acting roles. He got the part of the Gentleman Caller in Tennessee Williams’ The Glass Menagerie. Huguley then moved back to the United States, where he began to work regularly in theatre and studied at the Lee Strasberg Institute. He moved to Los Angeles to do a play directed by Lee’s widow, Anna Strasberg.

In his earliest appearances on television, Huguley starred in smaller roles on Mad TV, The Norm Show, Walker, Texas Ranger, Providence, and Strong Medicine before getting more recurring roles in TV shows such as Summerland, and Alias. He also starred in 2010 as Richard Hightower on the long-running soap opera, The Young and the Restless.

Huguley is best known for playing David on AMC's The Walking Dead, and Jimmy Ledoux on HBO's True Detective. Huguley also played Will Branson on Seasons 3 and 4 of the HBO series Treme, and Whit Peyton in the ABC TV series, Brothers & Sisters.

Huguley has also played recurring characters in ABC Family's "Ravenswood" (spin-off to Pretty Little Liars), and in the CW's Star-Crossed. He's also guest-starred in episodes of Crazy Ex-Girlfriend, Red Band Society, Nashville, Breaking In, Drop Dead Diva, and Army Wives.

In 2013, he appeared in Steve McQueen’s film 12 Years a Slave, starring Chiwetel Ejiofor, Brad Pitt, and Michael Fassbender.

In 2015, he appeared in Helen Hunt's Ride, and starred as Jonah Bock in the hit indie darling, Sunny in the Dark, a feature film written by Courtney Ware, for which he took home the award for "Best Actor" from the Northeast Film Festival.

In 2016, Huguley appeared in the highly anticipated horror film, Abattoir, by the man credited for furthering the Saw franchise, Darren Lynn Bousman. Abattoir has already nabbed a sequel deal, prior to its official theatrical release.

Huguley's most recent roles include Heart, Baby and William Henry Moody in Lizzie, both released in 2018. He has twice portrayed historical figures. In 2013, he played Sheriff H.P. Voorhies, the man who negotiated freedom of Solomon Northup in 12 Years a Slave and most recently, as William Henry Moody, the prosecuting attorney in the infamous Lizzie Borden trial in the film Lizzie alongside Chloe Sevigny and Kristen Stewart.

In 2008, Huguley starred in David Lindsay-Abaire’s Tony Award-winning play Rabbit Hole at the Skylight Theatre. About his performance, the Los Angeles Times said, "Jay Huguley dwells inside the play’s contradictions and connects us to its anguished, buoyant heart." In 2009, Huguley played the lead role of Henry in Tom Stoppard’s play The Real Thing at Los Angeles’ Skylight Theatre.

Filmography

Film

Television

References

External links

Profile on TV Guide

1966 births
Living people
American University alumni
Lee Strasberg Theatre and Film Institute alumni
Male actors from New Jersey
Alumni of the University of London
American male film actors
American male television actors
People from Englewood, New Jersey
People from Tenafly, New Jersey
20th-century American male actors
21st-century American male actors